Seo Taiji and Boys IV is the fourth and final studio album by Korean musical trio Seo Taiji and Boys, released on October 5, 1995. With 2.4 million copies sold, it is one of the best-selling albums in South Korea. The single "Come Back Home" was released off of the album, and was voted the year's most popular K-pop song by netizens in 2005.

Overview
"Come Back Home" was a foray into Gangsta rap. Seo Taiji wrote the song about his own experiences running away from home. The third track, "Pilseung" (필승, lit. Must Triumph), was a hit with its alternative rock sound. "Goodbye" on this album is instrumental. A version with vocals was later released on their 1996 compilation, entitled Goodbye Best Album. "Free Style" was written and composed by Seo and his former Sinawe bandmate Kim Jong-seo. Kim provides vocals on the track, appears in its music video and included it on his own 1995 album, Thermal Island.

Lee Juno later stated that group leader Seo made the decision to disband Seo Taiji and Boys himself while recording their fourth album, much to the surprise of Yang Hyun-suk and himself.

Reception
In April 1996, Billboard reported that the album was nearing the 2 million copies sold mark. The album has sold over 2.4 million copies, making it the group's best selling album. Kyunghyang Shinmun ranked the album number 36 on its 2007 list of the Top 100 Pop Albums. Chuck Eddy of Spin wrote that on their fourth album, Seo Taiji and Boys "were all over the map: horse-whinnying Cypress Hill–style nasal frat-hop, Rancid-like surf-guitared ska-punk, metal shrieking, blues-rock solos, flutes, Brazilian percussion, turntable-scratching of acid-rock riffs, smooth-jazz interludes with doo-woppish sha-la-las."

Controversies
"Come Back Home" has been criticized for being similar to Cypress Hill's 1993 hit "Insane in the Brain". However, Cypress Hill member B-Real later explained they were aware of the controversy but "we were cool about shit like that." "Sidae Yugam" (시대유감, lit. Regret of the Times) was rejected by the Public Performance Ethics Committee for having lyrics that criticized the government. Seo Taiji declined to alter the cited lyrics and instead, the album includes only an instrumental version of the song. The lyrics below were requested be removed/altered, after being translated into English:

The backlash from the fans was immense, and the system of 'pre-censorship' (사전심의제) was abolished in June 1996, partially as a result of this. An EP titled Sidae Yugam and including the original vocal version of the song was released a month after the system was abolished.

Track listing 
English titles are based on the official translations provided by the Seotaiji Company for international markets. All tracks were written by Seo Taiji, except track 9 written and composed by Seo Taiji and Kim Jong-seo.

Credits and personnel
Seo Taiji − vocals, guitar on tracks 2, 3, 7 & 10, bass on track 9
Yang Hyun-suk − vocals
Lee Juno − vocals
Kim Jong-seo − vocals on track 9
Michael Landau − guitar on tracks 1 & 5
Tim Pierce − guitar on tracks 2, 3 & 9
Josh Freese − drums on tracks 1−3 & 5
Neil Stubenhaus − bass on tracks 1−3 & 5
DJ Ralph M − scratching on tracks 4 & 9
Lee Jung-sik − saxophone on track 8

References

External links

1995 albums
Seo Taiji and Boys albums